Alvin and the Chipmunks is an American animated television series featuring the Chipmunks, produced by Bagdasarian Productions in association with Ruby-Spears Enterprises from 1983 to 1987, Murakami-Wolf-Swenson in 1988 and DIC Entertainment from 1988 to 1990.

Series overview

Episodes by Ruby-Spears (Alvin and the Chipmunks)

Season 1 (1983)

Season 2 (1984)

Season 3 (1985)

Season 4 (1986)

Season 5 (1987)

Episodes by Murakami-Wolf-Swenson and DIC Entertainment (The Chipmunks)

Season 6 (1988–89)

Season 7 (1989)

Season 8: The Chipmunks Go to the Movies (1990) 
This was a retool of the series and parodied many movies from its era.

References

External links 

Alvin and the Chipmunks
Lists of American children's animated television series episodes